Devolved Parliament is a 2009 oil-on-canvas painting by Banksy, replacing British politicians debating in the House of Commons with chimpanzees. In 2019, the artwork became Banksy's most costly to date, selling for £9.9 million ($12.2 million) at Sotheby's in London on October 3, 2019.

The work measures .  It was titled Question Time when first shown at the Bristol Museum & Art Gallery's 2009 Banksy show.  It was sold to a private collector in 2011.    The depiction of chimpanzees echoes Banksy's 2002 work Laugh Now, a 6-foot-long stencilled work showing a row of apes wearing aprons with the inscription "Laugh now, but one day we'll be in charge".    

A reworked and retitled version of the painting was exhibited in Bristol in March 2019, with changes to details such as a banana and some lamps.  Banksy commented, "Laugh now, but one day no-one will be in charge".

See also

 List of most expensive artworks by living artists

References

2009 paintings
Chimpanzees in art
Political art
Works by Banksy